Steven K. D'Arcy is a judge currently serving on the Tax Court of Canada. Prior to his appointment, he was a recognized attorney on international tax issues.

References

Living people
Schulich School of Law alumni
Judges of the Tax Court of Canada
Year of birth missing (living people)